Chris Stevenson (died 2014) was an author and professor of mental health nursing at Dublin City University, where she was also head of the School of Nursing. She was appointed in 2005, having begun her career as a psychiatric nurse.

Career 
Stevenson trained as a psychiatric nurse before completing a BA (Hons) in psychology and sociology at Sunderland Polytechnic. She then returned to nursing as a community psychiatric nurse, specialising in working with families. Whilst working as a nurse, she studied for an MSc in health and social research at the University of Northumbria, and for seven years she held a clinical lectureship at Newcastle University. She then became a reader in nursing at the University of Teesside, and deputy director of the Teesside Centre for Rehabilitation Sciences.

On her appointment to Dublin City University, she established a qualitative study into attempted suicide by young men in Ireland, noting that suicide is the most common cause of death in 15 to 24-year-old males in Ireland and that mental health nurses are currently not properly trained to deal with people with severe mental health issues, describing the problem as "professional avoidance in engaging meaningfully with the person." A further report in 2010 stressed the implications of the study for suicide prevention strategies.

The following year she was working for ParSons Dowd Psychological of Newcastle, UK as a chartered psychologist and family therapist, and still researching factors linked to suicide. She was later affiliated to the University of Ulster.

Chris Stevenson died on 13 November 2014 at Legan, Co. Longford, in Ireland.

Published works
Stevenson published the following books or chapters of books:
Transcending Suicidality: Facilitating re-vitalizing worthiness (with E. Gordon and John R. Cutcliffe). In: John R. Cutcliffe et al. (Eds), Routledge International Handbook of Clinical Suicide Research. Routledge, 2013. .
Family Support: Growing the Family Support Network (with E. Gordon). In: P. Barker (Ed), Psychiatric and Mental Health nursing: The craft of caring (2nd Edition). London: Hodder Arnold, 2009. .
 INTAR: The International Network Toward Alternatives and Recovery (together with Laurie Ahern & Peter Stastny). In Peter Stastny & Peter Lehmann (eds.), Alternatives Beyond Psychiatry (pp. 359–366). Berlin / Eugene / Shrewsbury: Peter Lehmann Publishing.  (UK),  (USA). (E-Book 2018)
 INTAR – Das internationale Netzwerk für Alternativen und Recovery (together with Laurie Ahern & Peter Stastny). In Peter Lehmann & Peter Stastny (eds.), Statt Psychiatrie 2 (pp. 377–385). Berlin / Eugene / Shrewsbury: Antipsychiatrieverlag. . (E-Book 2018)
Care of the Suicidal Person, Elsevier, 2006.
Patient and Person: Empowering Interpersonal Relations in Nursing, Elsevier, 2004.
The Construction of Power and Authority in Psychiatry. Oxford, Butterworth-Heinemann, 2000.
Integrating Perspectives on Health, Open University Press, 1996.

References

Year of birth missing
Alumni of the University of Sunderland
Alumni of Northumbria University
Academics of Newcastle University
Academics of Teesside University
Academics of Dublin City University
English nurses
Psychiatric nurses
Medical educators
British women academics
2014 deaths